Peter Raymond Draper  (born 23 October 1957) is Professor (Emeritus) of Nursing Education and Scholarship and former Director of the Teaching Excellence Academy at the University of Hull. He is also a Self-Supporting Minister in the Church of England.

Education 
Draper is a Registered Nurse with a BSc in nursing from Leeds Polytechnic (now Leeds Beckett University) (1986), a Certificate in Education from the University of Leeds (1987), a PhD in nursing from the University of Hull (1994) and a Diploma in Theology and Ministry from the University of Durham (2005).

Professional life 
Draper has led the postgraduate portfolio in nursing at the University of Hull and has conducted research in the areas of care of older people, interdisciplinary education and spirituality.

Awards and recognition 
Draper was awarded a National Teaching Fellowship (2013) and is a Principal Fellow of the Higher Education Academy.

Bibliography 
Draper has 110 publications listed on Google Scholar that have been cited more than 3000 times, giving him an h-index of 22. His three most-cited articles are:

References

External links 

 

 Google Scholar

 

Nursing researchers
Academics of the University of Hull
English nurses
1963 births
Living people
Alumni of the University of Leeds
Alumni of Leeds Beckett University
Alumni of the University of Hull
Alumni of Durham University
Fellows of the Higher Education Academy
Clergy from Bradford